Virginia class may refer to three classes of warship;

 , a class of pre-Dreadnought battleships
 , a class of nuclear-powered cruisers built during the Cold War
 , a 21st-century class of nuclear-powered attack submarines